The Parnall Correctional Facility is a state prison for men located in Jackson, Jackson County, Michigan, owned and operated by the Michigan Department of Corrections.  

The facility's buildings were first opened in 1926.  Present-day Parnall is one portion of the former Michigan State Prison, described as the largest walled prison in the world as late as 1981, when it was rocked by extensive, damaging riots.    The prison was divided in 1988 into smaller institutions.  As of 2016, Parnell and three other components remain open:  

 the G. Robert Cotton Correctional Facility, an educational facility
 the Charles Egeler Reception and Guidance Center, an intake and processing facility for all male state prisoners
 the Cooper Street Correctional Facility, a discharge and processing facility

References

Prisons in Michigan
Buildings and structures in Jackson County, Michigan
1926 establishments in Michigan